The 142nd IOC Session is an upcoming IOC Session scheduled to be held in Athens, Greece in 2025. At this session, the tenth President of the International Olympic Committee will be elected.

IOC Presidential Election

Thomas Bach who is term-listed as President of the International Olympic Committee will conclude his tenure as President at this session. Bach was elected President at the 125th IOC Session in Buenos Aires in 2013. The tenth IOC President will be elected at this session.

Publicly expressed interest in running

 Sebastian Coe
Lord Sebastian Coe who has served as the President of World Athletics since 2015 has expressed interest in running. In January 2023 he publicly expressed interest in running and did not rule out the possibility of seeking the IOC Presidency. Coe has served as an IOC member since 2020 and previously served as the President of the London 2012 Olympic organizing committee.

 Juan Antonio Samaranch Salisachs
Juan Antonio Samaranch Salisachs who is the son of former IOC President Juan Antonio Samaranch has expressed interest in running. Before being elected to return as one of the IOC's four Vice-Presidents in 2022, Samaranch suggested he could run for the presidency. He has served as an IOC member since 2001.

Potential candidates

Several candidates have seen speculation around their potential candidacy. At times it has been suggested that the next President should be a woman. There has also been speculation of the current President, Thomas Bach possibly extending his tenure as President should the Olympic Charter be amended to allow it.

 Nicole Hoevertsz
IOC member since 2006, IOC Vice-President since 2021, chair of Los Angeles 2028 Coordination Commission
 Neven Ilic
IOC member since 2017, President of Pan American Sports Organization since 2017
 Kolinda Grabar-Kitarović
IOC member since 2020, President of Croatia from 2015 to 2020
 Thomas Bach
IOC President since 2013, Olympic champion in Fencing- Montreal 1976
 Sergey Bubka
IOC member since 2008, candidate for IOC President in 2013, Olympic Champion in athletics- Seoul 1988
 Kirsty Coventry
IOC member since 2013, Ministry of Youth, Sport, Arts and Recreation in Zimbabwe since 2018, chair of Brisbane 2032 coordination commission, Olympic champion in swimming- Athens 2004 and Beijing 2008

References

International Olympic Committee sessions
2023 in Greek sport
Sport in Athens
2025 conferences
Events in Athens
2020s in Athens
Sporting events in Greece
IOC Presidential elections
IOC